Belemedik railway station is a railway station in the village of Belemedik, Adana in Turkey.

Belemedik station was originally opened on 21 December 1912 by the Baghdad Railway and played an important role in transporting troops to the Mesopotamian and Palestine fronts during World War I. The station was also a gap in the railway, thus goods and soldiers disembarked at Belemedeik and walked to Durak (on the other side of the valley) where the railway continued. The pass through Çakıt Valley was finally completed on 9 October 1918, 11 days before the Ottoman Empire capitulated.

Belemedik station consists of an island platform and a side platform serving two tracks, with a third track as a siding.

TCDD Taşımacılık operates two daily intercity trains from Konya and Kayseri to Adana.

References

External links
TCDD Taşımacılık
Passenger trains
Belemedik station timetable

Railway stations in Adana Province
Railway stations opened in 1912
1912 establishments in the Ottoman Empire